So It Goes is the only studio album by New York City hip hop group Ratking, which consisted of rappers Wiki and Hak, and producer Sporting Life. It was released on April 8, 2014 by HXC Recordings. It was entirely engineered by Young Guru. The album's title was inspired by Kurt Vonnegut's novel Slaughterhouse-Five. The album features collaborations with King Krule, Salomon Faye, and Wavy Spice. The album reached #13 on the Billboard Heatseekers Albums, #38 on Top R&B/Hip-Hop Albums, and #21 on Rap Albums.

Reception

At Metacritic, which assigns a weighted average score out of 100 to reviews from mainstream critics, So It Goes received an average score of 78 based on 19 reviews, indicating "generally favorable reviews."

Kyle Kramer of Pitchfork said: "There's a pulsing, lived-in energy to So It Goes that captures what New York feels like and pushes at the boundaries of lyrically-driven rap." So It Goes was later placed at number 200 on Pitchfork's "The 200 Best Albums of the 2010s" list.

Critic Ben Ratliff ranked So It Goes at number 5 on his "Top 10 Albums of 2014" list for The New York Times.

The album was touted as the best album of 2014 by Vice.

Track listing

 Notes
 signifies an additional producer
 "Remove Ya" and "So It Goes" contains additional vocals from Kaila Paulino

 Sample credits
 "Remove Ya" contains a sample from "Never Rub a Dub" written and performed by Clement Dodd
 "Take" contains a sample from "As Long As I've Got You" written by Isaac Hayes and David Porter, and performed by The Charmels

Charts

References

External links

2014 debut albums
Ratking (group) albums
XL Recordings albums